The Florentino Ameghino Dam (Dique Florentino Ameghino) is a gravity dam in Chubut Province, Patagonia, Argentina,  west of the city of Trelew.  The dam also protects the towns in the lower Chubut River valley from flooding.  

The Florentino Ameghino is located on the Chubut River, which originates from snowmelt in the Andes.  Work began on the dam in 1943, led by the engineer Antonio Pronsato; the dam was inaugurated in 1963.  The dam has two Francis turbines of  each.  The dam is currently operated by Hidroeléctrica Ameghino.

Adjacent to the dam is a town with approximately 200 residents called Villa Dique Florentino Ameghino.  The dam takes its name from Florentino Ameghino, an Argentine naturalist, paleontologist, anthropologist and zoologist.

External links

 Images and information about Florentino Ameghino Dam from Vistas del Valle
 Hidroeléctrica Ameghino official site

Dams completed in 1963
Energy infrastructure completed in 1963
Hydroelectric power stations in Argentina
Tourist attractions in Chubut Province   
Dams in Argentina
1963 establishments in Argentina